Oecanthus rileyi, known generally as the Riley's tree cricket or pine tree cricket, is a species of tree cricket in the family Gryllidae. It is found in North America.

References

rileyi
Orthoptera of North America
Insects described in 1905
Taxa named by Charles Fuller Baker
Articles created by Qbugbot